Dimitrios "Dimitris" Nikolaidis (born 10 June 1999) is a Greek water polo player, who is a member of Greece men's national water polo team. He is part of Greece national team that competes at the 2018 European Water Polo Championship in Barcelona. He plays for Italian team Brescia, Nikolaidis won the 2017–18 LEN Champions League with Olympiacos in Genoa

References

Greek male water polo players
Olympiacos Water Polo Club players
Living people
Place of birth missing (living people)
1999 births
Mediterranean Games medalists in water polo
Mediterranean Games silver medalists for Greece
Competitors at the 2018 Mediterranean Games
Water polo players at the 2015 European Games
European Games bronze medalists for Greece
European Games medalists in water polo
Water polo players from Thessaloniki
World Aquatics Championships medalists in water polo